is a near-Earth asteroid of the Apollo group, discovered by astronomers Alain Maury and G. Attard at San Pedro de Atacama, Chile on 15 January 2021. It has a highly elliptical orbit that brings it within Earth's orbit.

Discovery 
 was discovered by astronomers Alain Maury and G. Attard at San Pedro de Atacama, Chile on 15 January 2021. It was first observed in the constellation Canis Major at an apparent magnitude of 19.8.

The asteroid was subsequently listed on the Minor Planet Center's Near-Earth Object Confirmation Page (NEOCP) as 11E401. Over three days, follow-up observations were carried out by various observatories including Spacewatch  at Kitt Peak and the Steward Observatory  at Mount Lemmon.

Orbit and classification 

These precovery observations were published by the Minor Planet Center on 30 April 2021.

 orbits the Sun at an average distance of 3.05 AU once every 5.33 years. Its orbit has a high eccentricity of 0.71 and an inclination of 29° with respect to the ecliptic plane. Over the course of its orbit, its distance from the Sun ranges from 0.90 AU at perihelion to 5.2 AU at aphelion, crossing the orbits of Earth, Mars, and Jupiter. Since its orbit crosses that of Earth's while having a semi-major axis greater than 1 AU,  is classified as an Apollo asteroid.

Physical characteristics

Diameter and albedo 
Based on an magnitude-to-diameter conversion and a measured absolute magnitude of 18.9,  measures between 440 and 1,000 meters in diameter for an assumed geometric albedo of 0.25 and 0.05, respectively.

References

External links 
 MAP program discoveries, Alain Maury, San Pedro de Atacama Celestial Explorations, 10 February 2021
 
 
 

Minor planet object articles (unnumbered)

Near-Earth objects in 2021
20210115